This is the list of presidents of Friuli Venezia Giulia since 1964.

Elected by the Regional Council (1964–2003)
Directly-elected presidents (since 2003)

|}

Politics of Friuli-Venezia Giulia
Friuli-Venezia Giulia